Maagiya Kanasu is a 1977 Indian Kannada-language film, directed by K. S. L. Swamy and produced by K. A. Gopal and Lakshman. It is based on a novel by K. Saroja Rao. The film stars Srinath, Aarathi and Shubha in main roles. The film has musical score by Vijaya Bhaskar.

Cast
Srinath
Aarathi
Shubha
Ambareesh
Sathyapriya
Chandrashekhar

Soundtrack
The music was composed by Vijaya Bhaskar.

References

External links
 

1977 films
1970s Kannada-language films
Films scored by Vijaya Bhaskar
Films directed by K. S. L. Swamy